SV Overbos is a Dutch football club from Hoofddorp, which plays in the Tweede Klasse since 2012/13.

Club history
Founded 17 May 1986, SV Overbos is a  Dutch football club from Hoofddorp, North Holland which plays in the Tweede Klasse since 2012/13. Their grounds consist of eight pitches, and the club is dedicated to promote the sport within their community, fielding both a Men's and a Women's team. The men play their matches on Saturdays, whilst the women play on Sundays. Erik Drogtop is the longest playing member of the club.

Affiliated clubs
On 13 January 2013, it was revealed that SV Overbos would partner with AFC Ajax Vrouwen, the Women's team from Amsterdam.

  AFC Ajax Vrouwen (2013–present)

References

Football clubs in the Netherlands
Women's football clubs in the Netherlands
1986 establishments in the Netherlands
Sport in Haarlemmermeer
Association football clubs established in 1986
Football clubs in North Holland